Lamin Colley (born 5 July 1993) is a Gambian footballer who plays as a forward for Puskás Akadémia.

Career
Colley started his career with English ninth division side Farsley Celtic.

In 2014, Colley signed for Bradford (Park Avenue) in the English sixth division after playing for English eighth division club Harrogate Railway Athletic.

In 2017, he returned to Farsley Celtic in the English seventh division.

Before the second half of the 2018–19 season, he signed for RAAL in the Belgian fourth division.

In 2019, Colley signed for Slovenian outfit Gorica.

For the 2021–22 season, Colley moved from Gorica to Koper.

On 1 June 2022, Colley signed with Hungarian club  Puskás Akadémia.

References

External links
 

1993 births
Living people
Gambian footballers
English footballers
Gambian expatriate footballers
Association football forwards
Farsley Celtic F.C. players
Harrogate Railway Athletic F.C. players
Bradford (Park Avenue) A.F.C. players
Stockport County F.C. players
Boston United F.C. players
ND Gorica players
FC Koper players
Puskás Akadémia FC players
Slovenian Second League players
Slovenian PrvaLiga players
Nemzeti Bajnokság I players
Gambian expatriate sportspeople in Belgium
Gambian expatriate sportspeople in Hungary
Expatriate footballers in Belgium
Expatriate footballers in Slovenia
Expatriate footballers in Hungary
English people of Gambian descent